Sweet Home Cookin' is the second studio album by American jazz singer Karrin Allyson. The album was recorded at Sage & Sound Recording, Hollywood, California on June 9–10, 1993, and at Soundtrek, Kansas City, Missouri, on September 9, 1993. The record was released on March 1, 1994, via Concord Jazz label.

Reception

Scott Yanow of AllMusic stated: "Karrin Allyson has a small and sometimes hoarse voice but she does so much with it that her bop session is easily recommended. Her all-star sextet ... has plenty of short solos on colorful charts by Alan Broadbent. Allyson sounds perfectly at ease, whether scatting on 'No Moon at All,' finding fresh melodic variations on 'I Cover the Waterfront,' or singing her original blues 'Sweet Home Cookin' Man.' She always swings." Doug Ramsey in his review for JazzTimes commented: "Although there is no evidence of strain or intonation problems in her voice, it loses body on some low notes, probably a consequence of aiming below her true range."

Track listing

Personnel
Karrin Allyson – vocals
Randy Sandke – trumpet
Bob Cooper – tenor sax
Danny Embrey – guitar
Alan Broadbent – piano
Putter Smith – bass
Sherman Ferguson – drums

References

1994 albums
Karrin Allyson albums